Events from the year 1733 in Sweden

Incumbents
 Monarch – Frederick I

Events

 27 August - The first vessel of the Swedish East India Company return to Gothenburg in Sweden from China.
 - The last execution by Breaking wheel is performed.

Births

 15 October – Lisa Eriksdotter, charismatic (died year unknown)
 Johanna Löfblad, actress  (died 1811) 
 Anna Brita Sergel, artist (embroidery), an official decorator of the royal Swedish court (died 1819)
 Margaretha Zetterberg, textile artist (died 1803) 
 Maria Magdalena Eek, pastry chef (died 1800)
 Lisbetta Isacsdotter, religious leader  (died 1767)

Deaths
 16 February - Ulrika Eleonora Stålhammar, female soldier and cross dresser  (born 1683)
 - Lovisa von Burghausen, noblewoman known for her slavenarrative  (born 1698)

References

 
Years of the 18th century in Sweden
Sweden